Daniel "Boom" Desjardins (born 1971) is a French Canadian singer from Val-d'Or, Quebec. He was an original member of the rock band La Chicane for eleven years, from 1993 until 2004, when he left to begin a solo career.

Desjardins was nominated for Artist of the Year and Pop Album of the Year at the Juno Awards of 2006.

Personal life 
Desjardins has been known by the nickname of "Boom" for most of his life. As an infant, he learned to walk at an early age and was a boisterous child; his family noted the similarity to the character of Bamm-Bamm (in Quebec French, "Boum-Boum") from the popular television show The Flintstones, and began calling him "Boom" as a result. According to Desjardins, everyone called him Boom, including his family, teachers, and school principal, and he has stated that "my name is not Daniel, Daniel is someone else... my name is Boom."

Discography

References

External links 
 Official site
 

1971 births
Canadian rock singers
French-language singers of Canada
Singers from Quebec
People from Val-d'Or
Living people
21st-century Canadian male singers